The 1982 Soviet First League was the twelfth season of the Soviet First League and the 42nd season of the Soviet second tier league competition.

Final standings

Match for 1st place

Top scorers

Number of teams by union republic

External links
 1982 season. RSSSF

1982
2
Soviet
Soviet